Richardson's ground squirrel (Urocitellus richardsonii), also known as the dakrat or flickertail, is a North American ground squirrel in the genus Urocitellus. Like a number of other ground squirrels, they are sometimes called prairie dogs or gophers, though the latter name belongs more strictly to the pocket gophers of family Geomyidae, and the former to members of the genus Cynomys.

Taxonomy

This squirrel was named after the Scottish naturalist Sir John Richardson. North Dakota is nicknamed the Flickertail state after the squirrel. The nickname Dakrat is derived from "Dakota Rat" and is a commonly used name around Minot, North Dakota and on Minot Air Force Base.

Habitat
Native to the short grass prairies, Richardson's ground squirrel is found mainly in the northern states of the United States, such as North Dakota and Montana, and in western Canada, including central and southern Alberta and southern Saskatchewan. The range of this animal expanded as forests were cleared to create farmland. They are not simply restricted to prairie; sometimes they adapt to suburban environments, causing them to be seen as pests because of the burrows they dig. It is not unusual to find squirrels digging tunnels under the sidewalks and patios of urban homes.

Description
Males are slightly larger and heavier than females on average. They are dark brown on the upper side and tan underneath. The tail is shorter and less bushy than in other ground squirrels, and the external ears are so short as to look more like holes in the animal's head. Behavior is more like that of a prairie dog than a typical ground squirrel. The tail is constantly trembling, so the animal is sometimes called the "flickertail".

Males have an average life expectancy of 3 years, while females average 4 years. However, in captivity some individuals may live for 5 to 7 years.

Behavior

Richardson's ground squirrels appear to live communally, but they organize their social structure around female kinship. A female Richardson's ground squirrel will tolerate the presence of closely related females, but are territorial towards other individuals.  Individuals are territorial around their nest sites. The burrows of Richardson's ground squirrels are grouped closely together in colonies, and individuals give audible alarm calls when possible predators approach. Recent research has shown that in some cases, ultrasonic alarm calls are given, and are responded to by other members of the colony. Richardson's ground squirrels use two audible alarm calls, a high-pitched whistle and a 'chirp' call. The whistle is given in response to terrestrial predators, while the chirp is given in response to aerial predators such as hawks.

Predators include hawks, owls, snakes, weasels, badgers and coyotes.

Feeding
These animals are omnivores, eating seeds, nuts, grains, grasses and insects. In addition they have cannibalistic tendencies, where they will consume the corpses of other ground squirrels after dragging them down their burrows or indeed on the surface.

Hibernation
Adult ground squirrels may hibernate as early as July, though in their first year, the young ground squirrels do not hibernate until September. The males emerge from hibernation in March, and establish territories before the females emerge a couple of weeks later. Abandoned burrows are sometimes taken over by other grassland species such as the burrowing owl.

Reproduction
Female Richardson's ground squirrels produce one litter per year. Litter size averages 6, though the maximum size recorded is 14. The young are born in April or May.  Young ground squirrels remain underground in the burrow until they are approximately 30 days old, emerging from natal burrows late May to mid-June. At emergence, the young weigh 50 to 100 grams.

Relationship with humans

Because they will readily eat crop species, Richardson's ground squirrels are sometimes considered to be agricultural pests, although this is not their legal status in all jurisdictions. The government of Saskatchewan declared the animals pests in 2010, allowing local governments to employ gopher control measures. In areas with few natural predators, overpopulation and increasing density can drive ground squirrels to expand into suburban neighborhoods.

Control measures
Farmers and ranchers have developed a variety of ways to exterminate ground squirrels besides trapping, shooting and poisoning. One such process fills the burrows with a mixture of oxygen and propane and then ignites the gas mixture. This kills the ground squirrels with a concussive force that also collapses the tunnel systems. Even if effective, ground squirrels from outside of the treated areas will eventually spread back into the area.

The Saskatoon Wildlife Federation sponsored a 12-week "gopher derby" in 2002, in an effort to reduce what it considered an overpopulation of the squirrels. Cash prizes were awarded for the most number of animals killed, with the animals' tails being presented as proof of the kill. The Canadian Humane Society called the contest cruel and barbaric. Despite the criticism, the derby was repeated in 2003. By 2004, the ground squirrel population had dropped and the contest was cancelled. 

The Gopher Hole Museum in Torrington, Alberta, Canada, has a large selection of stuffed ground squirrels of many varieties and colors.

Pet trade
The Richardson's ground squirrel in recent years has become popular in the exotic pet trade.

References

External links

Xander.it - Spermophilus richardsonii (Richardson's ground squirrels) videos
American Society of Mammalogists species account (pdf)
Information on keeping Richardson's ground squirrels as pets
Dr. Gail Michener's site on Richardson's ground squirrel

Urocitellus
Mammals of Canada
Fauna of the Plains-Midwest (United States)
Mammals of the United States
Agricultural pests
Mammals described in 1858
Taxa named by Joseph Sabine